You Must Be Love is the third and last album by Euro disco group Love & Kisses, released on Casablanca Records in 1979. On this 1979 album, Alec R. Costandinos composed all the tracks, such as the title cut. Also, this album features Katie Kissoon, Costandinos himself, Vicki Brown, credited on the back cover of the album as "Vickie Brown", Stephanie de Sykes, Arthur Simms, André Ceccarelli, credited on the back cover of the album as "Dede Ceccarelli", Liza Strike and Helen Chappelle.

Track listing
All songs composed by Alec R. Costandinos.
"Ooh La La La La" 7:37
"Your Middle Name Is Money" 7:35
"Find Yourself A Dream" 4:42
"You Must Be Love"

Personnel
Bass – Mo Foster
Drums – Joe Hammer
Guitar – Ricky Hitchcock, Slim Pezin
Keyboards – Alan Hawkshaw
Percussion – Frank Ricotti, Ray Cooper
Strings – Pat Halling String Ensemble
Synthesizer – Alec R. Costandinos, Georges Rodi, Stephen W. Tayler
Vocals – Alec R. Costandinos, Arthur Simms, Katie Kissoon, Stephanie de Sykes, Vicki Brown

Additional musicians
Alto Saxophone – George Young (tracks: A1, A2, A3)
Bass – Tony Bonfils (tracks: A1, A2, A3)
Drums – André Ceccarelli (tracks: A1, A2, A3)
Guitar – Jean-Claude Chavanat (tracks: A1, A2, A3)
Percussion – Alec R. Costandinos & Emmanuel Roche (tracks: A1, A2, A3)
Strings – Pat Halling String Ensemble (tracks: A1, A2, A3)
Programming – Georges Rodi (tracks: A1, A2, A3)
Synthesizer, Keyboards – Bernard Arcadio (tracks: A1, A2, A3)
Tenor Saxophone – Michael Brecker (tracks: A1, A2, A3)
Trumpet – John Faddis & Randy Brecker (tracks: A1, A2, A3)
Vocals – Alec R. Costandinos, Arthur Simms, Helen Chappelle, Katie Kissoon & Liza Strike (tracks: A1, A2, A3)

Technical personnel
Assistant engineers – Adam Moseley, Colin Green, Craig Milliner, Simon Hilliard
Engineer, re-mixed by Stephen W. Tayler
Photography by Scott Hensel
Art direction, design – Gribbitt!, Henry Vizcarra
Arranged & Conducted by – Raymond T. Knehnetsky
Producer By – Alec R. Costandinos
Arranged By, Conductor – Bernard Arcadio (tracks: A1, A2, A3)

References

External links

1979 albums
Love & Kisses albums
Casablanca Records albums